Tower of Song: A Memorial Tribute to Leonard Cohen was a concert, which was held at the Bell Centre in Montreal, Quebec on November 6, 2017 as a tribute to singer-songwriter Leonard Cohen marking the first anniversary of his death. The concert, which featured musicians performing Cohen songs, was subsequently broadcast by the Canadian Broadcasting Corporation as a radio and television special, airing on CBC Music on November 7, 2017 and on CBC Television on January 3, 2018.

The television broadcast received several Canadian Screen Award nominations at the 7th Canadian Screen Awards in 2019, including Best Variety or Entertainment Special, Best Direction in a Variety or Sketch Comedy Program (Jack Bender) and Best Writing in a Variety or Sketch Comedy Program (Carrie Mudd).

Performers
 Sting, "Dance Me to the End of Love"
 Feist, "Hey, That's No Way to Say Goodbye"
 Patrick Watson, "Who by Fire"
 Sharon Robinson, "I'm Your Man""
 Wesley Schultz and Jeremiah Fraites, "Democracy"
 Leonard Cohen (archival footage), "A Thousand Kisses Deep"
 Ron Sexsmith, "Suzanne"
 Elvis Costello, "The Future"
 Damien Rice, "Famous Blue Raincoat"
 Adam Cohen and The Webb Sisters, "So Long, Marianne"
 k.d. lang, "Hallelujah"
Intermission
 Shaar Hashomayim Choir with pre-recorded videos of: Willie Nelson, Céline Dion, Peter Gabriel and Chris Martin and archival footage of Leonard Cohen, "Tower of Song"
 Sting, "Sisters of Mercy"
 Lana Del Rey and Adam Cohen, "Chelsea Hotel #2"
 Bettye LaVette, "In My Secret Life"
 Courtney Love, "Everybody Knows"
 Seth Rogen, "Field Commander Cohen (poem)"
 Børns and The Webb Sisters, "If It Be Your Will
 Cœur de pirate, Adam Cohen and Damien Rice, "The Partisan"
 Elvis Costello, "Bird on the Wire"
Encore
 Sting, "Anthem"
 Shaar Hashomayim Choir with pre-recorded vocals of Leonard Cohen, "You Want It Darker"
Encore 2
 Adam Cohen and Basia Bulat, "Coming Back to You"
 Basia Bulat, "Closing Time"

References

External links

2017 in Canadian music
2018 in Canadian television
2018 television specials
Canadian television specials
Leonard Cohen
Tribute concerts